Bret Myers (born April 1, 1980) is an American former soccer player and current professor. Myers played with the Williamsburg Wizards youth travel team, with the University of Richmond, and with the Richmond Kickers. He won a gold medal with Team USA at the 11th Pan American Maccabi Games in 2008. He is a professor at Villanova University, and an analytics consultant for Major League Soccer's Columbus Crew.

Early life and education
Myers, a native of Richmond, Virginia, is the son of Dr. Thomas and Carolyn Myers, and is Jewish. Myers grew up attending the Beth Ahabah Temple, in Richmond. He attended Collegiate School in Richmond ('02).

He attended the University of Richmond (Robins School of Business, BS, Business Administration, Management and Operations '98). Myers also attended the University of Virginia (MS, Systems Engineering, '06) and Drexel University's Bennett S. LeBow College of Business (PhD, Decision Sciences, '09).

Soccer career
Myers played with the Williamsburg Wizards soccer travel club, coached by Al Albert, before enrolling in college.

He played forward in soccer at the University of Richmond. Myers was honored as a 2000 National Soccer Coaches Association of America scholar-athlete regional honoree, and was named Atlantic 10 Academic All-Conference. As of 2006, he was 6th on the Spider men's soccer career assist list, with 21, as he also scored 15 goals.

Myers played soccer for two seasons with the Richmond Kickers, from 2002-03.

He won a gold medal with Team USA at the 11th Pan American Maccabi Games in Buenos Aires, Argentina, in 2008.

Later life
Myers is a professor at Villanova University in Philadelphia, Pennsylvania, where he teaches business statistics. He is also an analytics consultant for Major League Soccer's Columbus Crew.

His wife Jill is a former field hockey player, and coach at the University of Richmond.

References

External links
Bret R. Myers, Ph.D., Michael Burns, Brian Q. Coughlin, Edward Bolte (September 17, 2021). "On the Development and Application of an Expected Goals Model for Lacrosse," The Sport Journal.

1980 births
21st-century American Jews
American soccer players
American statisticians
Association football midfielders
Columbus Crew non-playing staff
Drexel University alumni
Jewish American sportspeople
Jewish footballers
Living people
Richmond Kickers players
Richmond Spiders men's soccer players
Soccer players from Richmond, Virginia
Sports statisticians
Statistics educators
University of Virginia alumni
Villanova University faculty